Aspergillus ostianus is a species of fungus in the genus Aspergillus. It is from the Circumdati section. The species was first described in 1899. It has been reported to produce ochratoxin A.

Growth and morphology

A. ostianus has been cultivated on both Czapek yeast extract agar (CYA) plates and Malt Extract Agar Oxoid® (MEAOX) plates. The growth morphology of the colonies can be seen in the pictures below.

References 

ostianus
Fungi described in 1899